The Abbert River is a river in County Galway, Ireland, a tributary of the River Clare.

Course
The Abbert River rises in the Killaclogher Bog Natural Heritage Area. It flows westwards under the N63 (passing Abbeyknockmoy) and R347, then drains into the River Clare at Anbally.

Wildlife
The Abbert River is a trout fishery.

See also
Rivers of Ireland

References

Rivers of County Galway